Marios Neophytou (born February 4, 1977, in Limassol, Cyprus) is a retired Cypriot football striker and current football manager.

Club career 
He began his career in 1993, playing for AEL Limassol. He remained to AEL until 1999, when he was transferred to Anorthosis. In his last season in Anorthosis, after having a successful season with his team and playing in all the Championship matches for his team scoring thirty three goals and becoming the top scorer in the season 2002-2003. Then he caused the interest of the Greek team OFI and he transferred there in the summer of 2003. The next season, he returned in Cyprus, to APOEL where in three seasons he scored 26 goals. In June 2007 he signed with AEK Larnaca. In 2008, he signed for Nea Salamina and then for Olympiakos Nicosia in 2009. He then moved to APOP Kinyras Peyias. Afterwards he signed to Akritas Chlorakas in 2010 where he played for one year as a player and became the season's top scorer of the club.

International career 
On 15 November 2000, Neophytou made his debut with the national team of Cyprus in the home victory 5–0 against Andorra for 2002 FIFA World Cup qualification match, coming on as a substitute in 74th minute.

Coaching career 
In 2011, he became also the coach of Akritas team and continued also as a player. In June 2012, Neophytou signed with APEP, becoming their new coach/player. In April 2013, he undertook Ayia Napa, again with double role, so as to help the team to gain the promotion in the Cypriot First Division but in October 2013 left the club to join AEL Limassol as caretaker manager and later as an assistant manager by the side of the Bulgarian manager Ivaylo Petev. In November 2014, after Ivaylo Petev was sacked, Neophytou was also released from AEL.

References

External links 
 

1977 births
Living people
Cypriot footballers
Cyprus international footballers
Association football forwards
Sportspeople from Limassol
Anorthosis Famagusta F.C. players
AEL Limassol players
APOEL FC players
OFI Crete F.C. players
Olympiakos Nicosia players
AEK Larnaca FC players
Nea Salamis Famagusta FC players
APOP Kinyras FC players
APEP FC players
Ayia Napa FC players
Cypriot First Division players
Super League Greece players
Cypriot expatriate footballers
Expatriate footballers in Greece
Cypriot football managers
Akritas Chlorakas players
Ayia Napa FC managers